Mark Fitzpatrick (born November 13, 1968) is a Canadian former professional ice hockey goaltender. He moved to Kitimat, British Columbia, where he started minor hockey, when he was ten years old. He won the Memorial Cup twice as a member of the Medicine Hat Tigers before going on to a professional career with the Los Angeles Kings, New York Islanders, Florida Panthers, Tampa Bay Lightning and Chicago Blackhawks of the National Hockey League.

Fitzpatrick was drafted 27th overall in the 1987 NHL Entry Draft by the Los Angeles Kings but only spent a season with the Kings organization before he was traded along with Wayne McBean to the New York Islanders on February 22, 1989 for Kelly Hrudey.

During his time with the Islanders, he contracted Eosinophilia–myalgia syndrome, a potentially fatal neurological disease, which cost him nearly all of the 1990-91 season. He recovered and returned to the ice in February 1992. His efforts in returning to the league after the illness earned him the Bill Masterton Memorial Trophy in 1992. On June 20, 1993, with the expansion draft for the Florida Panthers and the Mighty Ducks of Anaheim approaching, the Islanders traded him to the Quebec Nordiques for Ron Hextall and a swap of first-round picks. Four days later, the Panthers claimed him in the expansion draft.

Fitzpatrick spent five seasons with the Panthers serving as backup goaltender to fellow expansion draft pick John Vanbiesbrouck. On January 16, 1998, Fitzpatrick was traded to the Tampa Bay Lightning with Jody Hull for Dino Ciccarelli and Jeff Norton where he only managed 7 wins in 34 games for the struggling Lightning who finished the season with the worst record.  Fitzpatrick was traded once more months later to the Chicago Blackhawks for Michal Sykora and spent the season in a backup capacity to Jocelyn Thibault.

He moved to Carolina Hurricanes for the 1999–2000 NHL season but spent the majority of the year in the International Hockey League for the Cincinnati Cyclones and just played three games for the Hurricanes.  Fitzpatrick spent one more season in the IHL for the Detroit Vipers before retiring in 2001.

Personal life
Fitzpatrick was previously married, in which he has a daughter from that marriage, which ended after Fitzpatrick was charged with assault and aggravated domestic battery on July 13, 1994 in Islamorada, Florida following an argument with his wife while she was seven months pregnant.

Career statistics

Regular season and playoffs

Awards
 WHL East Second All-Star Team – 1986 & 1988

References

External links

1968 births
Living people
Bill Masterton Memorial Trophy winners
Calgary Canucks players
Carolina Hurricanes players
Chicago Blackhawks players
Florida Panthers players
Ice hockey people from British Columbia
Ice hockey people from Toronto
Los Angeles Kings draft picks
Los Angeles Kings players
Medicine Hat Tigers players
New York Islanders players
People from Kitimat
Tampa Bay Lightning players
Canadian ice hockey goaltenders